Blanch Ackers (November 28, 1914 – May 24, 2003)   was an African-American folk artist, who was born in Arkansas but spent most of her life in Michigan. She began drawing and painting while in her seventies, and her work has been acquired by the University of Michigan Museum of Art.

Early life 
Ackers was born in 1914 in Pine Bluff, Arkansas, to Paul (a poor sharecropper) and Harriet (Williams) Markham. She had one brother, James Markham.

Career 
She moved to the Detroit area with her brother in 1943 to work for a factory, as part of the Great Migration, then later to Ypsilanti, where she spent the rest of her life.

In 1985, Ackers began to work in the Willow Run School District as a foster grandparent, through a program run by Child and Family Services.

Art 
While working as a teacher's aide at Ford Elementary School in Ypsilanti, the school's art teacher, Christine Hennessy, introduced her to drawing and watercolor painting. Her drawings, such as Homestead and Yellow Interior, often reflected her memories of growing up in Arkansas.

In 2002, the University of Michigan Museum of Art acquired five of her drawings.

On her work, Ackers once said, "I imagine it and I start drawing."

She was represented by the Pardee Collection.

Later life 
Ackers had one daughter, Birdes Lawrence Gardner, and two sons, Brodis Williams and Willie Williams. She died in 2003 at a nursing home.

References 

20th-century American women artists
Folk artists
Artists from Michigan
People from Pine Bluff, Arkansas
1914 births
2003 deaths
20th-century African-American women
20th-century African-American people
20th-century African-American artists
People from Ypsilanti, Michigan
21st-century African-American artists
21st-century African-American women
African-American women artists